Karatal District is a district of Jetisu Region in Kazakhstan. The administrative center of the district is the town of Ushtobe. Population:

References

Districts of Kazakhstan
Almaty Region